Hamilton Bluff is a rock bluff on the coast of Antarctica, about  west of Palmer Point and  west of Mount Caroline Mikkelsen. It was first mapped by Norwegian cartographers from air photos taken by the Lars Christensen Expedition, 1936–37. It was visited by I.R. McLeod, geologist with the Australian National Antarctic Research Expeditions (ANARE) Prince Charles Mountains survey party, 1969, and was named by the Antarctic Names Committee of Australia for R. Hamilton, a helicopter pilot with ANARE (Nella Dan) in 1968.

References

Cliffs of Antarctica
Landforms of Princess Elizabeth Land
Ingrid Christensen Coast